Linda Park (born 1978) is a Korean-American actress.

Linda Park may also refer to:

 Linda Park (comics), fictional character in the DC Comics universe
 Linda Sue Park (born 1960), American author of teen fiction

See also
 Linda Parks (born 1957), American politician in California